The Ministry of Transport and Communications (LVM) is one of the twelve ministries which comprise the Finnish Government. LVM oversees Finland's transportation network and the country's communication services.

LVM's budget for 2018 is €3,362,555,000. The ministry employs 180 people.

Agencies within the ministry's administrative reach include the Finnish Transport Agency, Trafi, FICORA, and the Finnish Meteorological Institute (FMI). The ministry is in charge of several state-owned companies; the most notable of these is Finland's national public broadcasting company, Yle.

References

External links

 Ministry of Transport and Communications

Government of Finland
Transport
Communications in Finland
Transport in Finland
Finland
Finland
Transport organisations based in Finland